Baker County is one of the 36 counties in the U.S. state of Oregon. As of the 2020 census, the population was 16,668. The county seat and largest city is Baker City. The county was organized on September 22, 1862, when a portion of Wasco County was partitioned off. The new county's area was reduced in 1864 when Union County was partitioned off, and again in 1887 when Malheur County was partitioned off. The county's lines were last adjusted in 1901 when a parcel was added to the county.

Baker County was named for Edward Dickinson Baker, a senator from Oregon who was killed at Ball's Bluff, a battle of the Civil War in Virginia in 1861. The county is part of the county definition of Eastern Oregon.

History
The first groups from the eastern U.S. following the Oregon Trail passed through the area on their way to the Willamette Valley, unaware of the potential wealth they passed over. At Flagstaff Hill, near Baker City,  of wagon ruts left by immigrants can still be seen.

Oregon Territory achieved statehood in 1859. In 1861 gold was discovered in eastern Wasco County, and a gold rush ensued.  The area quickly became the Northwest's largest producer of gold. In September 1862 the state assembly created Baker County from Wasco. Later, Union County and Malheur County were created from this county. Baker County's boundaries were adjusted for the last time in 1901, when the area between the Powder River and the Wallowa Mountains was returned to the county.

Auburn was the original county seat; a booming mining town with 5,000 inhabitants. Once the gold was mined out Auburn's population dwindled. In 1868 county voters made Baker City the new county seat. Baker City was incorporated in 1874.

The population of Baker County nearly quadrupled from 1880 to 1910, largely due to the Sumpter Valley Railroad and several of its spur lines.  The opening of the railroad helped lumber and mining operations develop.

In 1914 Fern Hobbs, on behalf of her employer Governor Oswald West, declared martial law in the Baker County city of Copperfield. This was the first declaration of martial law in the state since the American Civil War.

From 1915 through 1946, Baker County was represented in the Oregon State Senate by William H. Strayer.  When he died in 1946, Strayer had served in the Oregon legislature longer then than any person in the state's history.

Geography

The terrain of Baker County is generally rugged, with 30 percent of the county covered with forest. The eastern boundary of the county is described by the northward-flowing Snake River, and the county terrain generally slopes to the Snake River's valley.

Adjacent counties

 Union County - north
 Wallowa County - northeast
 Adams County, Idaho - east/Mountain Time Border
 Washington County, Idaho - southeast/Mountain Time Border
 Malheur County - south/Mountain Time Border
 Grant County - west

National protected areas
 Deer Flat National Wildlife Refuge (part)
 Hells Canyon National Recreation Area (part)
 Malheur National Forest (part)
 Whitman National Forest (part)

Demographics

2000 census
As of the 2000 census, there were 16,741 people, 6,883 households, and 4,680 families in the county. The population density was 6/sqmi (2/km2). There were 8,402 housing units at an average density of 3/sqmi (1/km2). The racial makeup of the county was:
 95.68% White
 0.23% Black or African American
 1.09% Native American
 0.38% Asian
 0.04% Pacific Islander
 0.92% from other races
 1.65% from two or more races.

2.34% of the population were Hispanic or Latino of any race. 18.4% were of English, 17.4% German, 11.4% American and 9.1% Irish ancestry.

There were 6,883 households, out of which 28.00% had children under the age of 18 living with them, 56.20% were married couples living together, 8.60% had a female householder with no husband present, and 32.00% were non-families. 27.80% of all households were made up of individuals, and 13.40% had someone living alone who was 65 years of age or older. The average household size was 2.37 and the average family size was 2.87.

The county population contained 24.20% under the age of 18, 5.80% from 18 to 24, 23.60% from 25 to 44, 27.30% from 45 to 64, and 19.00% who were 65 years of age or older. The median age was 43 years. For every 100 females there were 98.10 males. For every 100 females age 18 and over, there were 95.30 males.

The median income for a household in the county was $30,367, and the median income for a family was $36,106. Males had a median income of $27,133 versus $20,480 for females. The per capita income for the county was $15,612. About 10.10% of families and 14.70% of the population were below the poverty line, including 18.80% of those under age 18 and 12.40% of those age 65 or over.

2010 census
As of the 2010 census, there were 16,134 people, 7,040 households, and 4,430 families residing in the county. The racial makeup of the county was 94.6% white, 1.1% American Indian, 0.5% Asian, 0.4% black or African American, 0.1% Pacific islander, 1.0% from other races, and 2.4% from two or more races. Those of Hispanic or Latino origin made up 3.3% of the population. In terms of ancestry, 24.5% were German, 14.8% were Irish, 14.6% were English, and 8.1% were American.

Of the 7,040 households, 24.4% had children under the age of 18 living with them, 50.7% were married couples living together, 8.3% had a female householder with no husband present, 37.1% were non-families, and 31.2% of all households were made up of individuals. The average household size was 2.24 and the average family size was 2.78. The median age was 47.9 years.

The median income for a household in the county was $39,704 and the median income for a family was $50,507. Males had a median income of $43,849 versus $30,167 for females. The per capita income for the county was $21,683. About 12.7% of families and 19.9% of the population were below the poverty line, including 27.2% of those under age 18 and 10.6% of those age 65 or over.

Politics
Like all counties in eastern Oregon, the majority of registered voters who are part of a political party in Baker County are members of the Republican Party. Lyndon Johnson in 1964 was the last Democrat to carry the county in a presidential election. Jimmy Carter in 1976 was the closest any Democrat in a presidential election came to carrying Baker County since. In the 2008 presidential election, 64.37% of Baker County voters voted for Republican John McCain, while 31.95% voted for Democrat Barack Obama and 3.66% of voters either voted for a Third Party candidate or wrote in a candidate. These numbers have changed slightly from the 2004 presidential election, in which 69.2% voted for George W. Bush, while 29% voted for John Kerry, and 1.8% of voters either voted for a Third Party candidate or wrote in a candidate.

Economy
Gold mining was the original impetus for settlement in the area, and at one time the county was the largest gold producer in the Northwest. Gold dredging was conducted with the Sumpter Valley Gold Dredge. With the exhaustion of the gold fields, agriculture, stock raising, logging became the primary economic pursuits. In the last decades of the 20th century, tourism also contributed to the local economy, helped by attractions such as Eagle Cap Wilderness Area, Hells Canyon National Recreation Area, and Anthony Lakes Ski Area. The National Historic Oregon Trail Interpretive Center opened in 1993.

Portions of Season 11 of Discovery's TV show Gold Rush was filmed in Baker County.

Communities

Incorporated cities

 Baker City (county seat)
 Greenhorn 
 Haines
 Halfway
 Huntington
 Richland
 Sumpter
 Unity

Unincorporated communities

 Bridgeport
 Brownlee
 Carson
 China Town
 Clarksville
 Dixie
 Durkee
 Encina
 Hereford
 Homestead
 Hutchinson
 Jimtown
 Keating
 Lime
 Little Alps
 McEwen
 Newbridge
 Oxbow
 Pine
 Pine Creek
 Pleasant Valley
 Rock Creek
 Rye Valley
 Salisbury
 Sparta
 Sunset
 Weatherby
 Whitney
 Wingville

Ghost towns

 Auburn
 Bourne
 Copperfield
 Cornucopia
 Nelson
 Pocahontas
 Robinette

Education
School districts include:
 Baker School District 5J
 Burnt River School District 30J
 Huntington School District 16J
 North Powder School District 8J
 Pine-Eagle School District 61

Most of Baker County is within the Blue Mountain Community College district, while a portion is in the Treasure Valley Community College district.

See also
National Register of Historic Places listings in Baker County, Oregon

Notes

References

Further reading
 Baker County Historical Society, The History of Baker County, Oregon. Portland OR: Baker County Historical Society, 1986.
 Eloise Dielman, Jon Croghan, and Gary Dielman, Baker County Links to the Past. Baker City OR: Baker County Historical Society, 2001.
 Gary Dielman, "Discovering Gold in Baker County Library's Photograph Collection,"  Oregon Historical Quarterly, vol. 109, no. 1 (Spring 2008).
 Ruth H. Evans, Centennial Pioneer Families of Baker County. n.c.: n.p., c. 1974.
 Isaac Hiatt, Thirty-one years in Baker County: A History of the County from 1861 to 1893. Baker OR: Baker County Historical Society, 1970.
 Gordon Stewart and Patricia Stewart, Baker County Sketch Book. n.c.: n.p., 1956.
 An Illustrated History of Baker, Grant, Malheur and Harney Counties, with a Brief Outline of the Early History of the State of Oregon. Chicago: Western Historical Publishing Company, 1902.
 
 The History of Baker County, Oregon, 1986. Portland, Oregon: Baker County Historical Society, 1986.

External links
 Baker County Chamber of Commerce

 
1862 establishments in Oregon
Populated places established in 1862